"Where Are You Now" is a song by Belgian DJ Lost Frequencies and English singer Calum Scott. It was released on 30 July 2021 via Epic. The song was written by Dag Lundberg, Joacim Bo Persson, Michael Patrick Kelly, Sebastian Arman and Lost Frequencies, who also produced it. It was nominated for Best International Song at the 2023 Brit Awards.

Composition
The song is written in the key of F minor, with a tempo of 121 beats per minute.

Chart performance
Commercially, the song reached number one in Ireland, Poland, Hungary and Slovakia, as well as the top 10 in Australia, Austria, Belgium, Czech Republic, Denmark, Germany, Lithuania, Netherlands, Norway, Russia, Sweden, and Switzerland. It peaked at number three on the UK Singles Chart, becoming Lost Frequencies's highest-charting single since "Are You with Me" (2015). It stayed nineteen weeks at the number 1 spot in UK Dance Singles and Albums Charts. As of May 19, 2022, "Where Are You Now" has appeared on the German Dance Singles chart for a total of 38 weeks, including two separate stints at number one including seven weeks at the top spot in October and November 2021, before returning to the top spot in February 2022 where it has remained for fifteen weeks.

Track listing
Digital download and streaming
 "Where Are You Now" – 2:28

Digital download and streaming – Acoustic
 "Where Are You Now" (Acoustic) – 2:42

Digital download and streaming – Deluxe mix
 "Where Are You Now" (Deluxe mix) – 4:14

Digital download and streaming – Kungs remix
 "Where Are You Now" (Kungs remix) – 3:12

Digital download and streaming – Remix pack
 "Where Are You Now" (Kungs remix) – 3:12
 "Where Are You Now" (Deluxe mix) – 4:14

Credits and personnel
Credits adapted from Tidal.

 Lost Frequencies – producer, associated performer
 Dag Lundberg – lyricist
 Felix de Laet – lyricist
 Joacim Bo Persson – lyricist
 Michael Patrick Kelly – lyricist
 Sebastian Arman – lyricist
 Calum Scott – associated performer, vocal
 Lorna Blackwood – vocal producer
 Andres Algaba - mixer

Charts

Weekly charts

Year-end charts

Certifications

References

2021 singles
2021 songs
Calum Scott songs
Irish Singles Chart number-one singles
Lost Frequencies songs
Number-one singles in Poland
Tropical house songs
Songs written by Lost Frequencies
Songs about loneliness